is a district of Chiyoda, Tokyo, Japan, consisting of 1-chōme and 2-chōme. As of April 1, 2007, its population is 1,104. Note that Kanda-Hirakawachō, also located in the Chiyoda ward, is a completely different district. Hirakawachō's postal code is 102-0093.

Hirakawachō is located in the western part of the Chiyoda ward. It borders Kōjimachi to the north, Hayabusachō to the east, Nagatachō to the south, and Kioichō to the west. The Tokyo FM-Dōri Ave forms its northern boundary, the Aoyama-Dōri Ave forms its southern boundary, and the Prince-Dōri Ave forms its western boundary.

Transportation
The Kaizaka-Dōri Avenue runs around the center of the district. The Shuto Expressway Route 4 is located upon the Aoyama-Dōri Avenue.

An exit of the Nagatachō Station is situated on the Aoyama-Dōri Avenue.

Company headquarters
LVMH Moët Hennessy Louis Vuitton SE has its Japanese offices located in 2-1-1 Hirakawachō
Nabtesco headquarters located in 2-7-9 Hirakawachō

Education

 operates public elementary and junior high schools. Kōjimachi Elementary School (麹町小学校) is the zoned elementary school for Hirakawachō 1-2 chōme. There is a freedom of choice system for junior high schools in Chiyoda Ward, and so there are no specific junior high school zones. Chiyoda Ward operates Kojimachi Junior High School (千代田区立麹町中学校) in Hirakawachō.

References

Districts of Chiyoda, Tokyo